Kajiran (also Romanized as Kajīrān) is a village in Pain Taleqan Rural District, in the Central District of Taleqan County, Alborz Province, Iran. At the 2006 census, its population was 122, in 31 families.

References 

Populated places in Taleqan County